Alberta is one of Canada's provinces, and has established several official emblems that reflect the province's history, its natural and diverse landscapes, and its people.

Official symbols of Alberta

De facto symbols

While not officially adopted through legislation as emblems by the government of Alberta, these places and things are popularly associated with (hence could be considered symbols of) the province.

See also
 List of Canadian provincial and territorial symbols
 Canadian royal symbols

References

 
Alberta
Symbols
Canadian provincial and territorial symbols